Ewa Komander (born 24 February 1985 in Kędzierzyn-Koźle) is a Polish professional triathlete, Polish U23 Champion of the year 2007 and Elite silver medalist of the year 2008.

Ewa Komander moved to Poznań and represented the club Olimpia Poznań until December 2010.
In 2011 it was announced that she would represent Stadtwerke Team Witten in the German triathlon circuit Bundesliga.

ITU Competitions 
In the eight years from 2003 to 2010, Komander took part in 19 ITU triathlons and achieved 6 top ten positions, among which a European Cup gold medal in 2010 (Karlovy Vary) and a European Cup silver medal in 2009 (Varna).
The following list is based upon the official ITU rankings and the ITU Athlete's Profile Page.
Unless indicated otherwise, the following events are Olympic Distance Triathlons and refer to the Elite category.

BG = the sponsor British Gas · DNS = did not start · DNF = did not finish

References

External links 
 Polish Triathlon Federation in Polish

Polish female triathletes
1985 births
Living people
People from Kędzierzyn-Koźle
Sportspeople from Opole Voivodeship
20th-century Polish women
21st-century Polish women